is a lost 1933 Japanese black-and-white silent film directed by Torajiro Saito. A silent, three-reel comedy short, it uses the 1933 film King Kong as a backdrop to the story and was produced by Shochiku Studios (which released the original 1933 film in Japan on behalf of RKO). It is now considered a lost film.

Plot
Santa (Isamu Yamaguchi) and his friend Koichi (Nagamasa Yamada) are jobless vagabonds. They make their living by picking up coins on the streets. Santa has a girlfriend named Omitsu (Yasuko Koizumi), but her father Seizo (Kotaro Sekiguchi) does not like having his daughter date a penniless man. He breaks the lovers up and tries to marry his daughter off to a rich man. Desperate, Santa seeks employment and wanders the streets. He cannot find a job at all, but has an inspiration. RKO's King Kong has been released and is a big hit in Tokyo. He decides to capitalize on its success by dressing up as an ape and playing King Kong in a vaudeville theater. He approaches one theater owner to tell him of the idea and the owner is pleased with Santa's plan, thus giving him the job. Santa's King Kong show becomes an instant success, with Santa interacting amongst props on the theater stage in his gorilla suit (small buildings, toy airplanes, a doll, etc.). One day while performing on stage, Santa sees that Omitsu and her new rich boyfriend are in the audience. Blinded with rage, Santa jumps down from the stage and runs after them - with his gorilla suit still on! Santa creates chaos in the town as firemen and hunters chase him, thinking him an escaped gorilla that is running wild in the streets. Eventually Santa confronts the rich boyfriend and knocks him unconscious. He puts the gorilla suit on him and leaves him lying out cold in the street. Just then, Koichi comes and tells Santa that the theater owner will give him a lot of money for his performances. Now that he has wealth, Santa marries Omitsu.

Production

Shochiku Studios produced this Torajiro Saito comedy short. Shochiku released King Kong in Japan on behalf of RKO and wanted to fund this film as a tie-in to the film's release, which is used as a backdrop in the story. Torajiro Saito was a very popular film producer/comedian at the time, known for his successful comedy shorts. Going by the information presented by magazines and newspapers covering the film's release, it is believed that there are no actual special effects in the film, as it focuses on a man trying to earn money to woo his girlfriend by playing the King Kong character on stage.

Cast

See also
King Kong Appears in Edo
List of lost films

References

External links
Entry in The Encyclopedia of Science Fiction
 

1933 films
1933 comedy films
1933 lost films
1930s parody films
1933 short films
Japanese black-and-white films
Japanese silent short films
King Kong (franchise) films
Lost Japanese films
Films directed by Torajiro Saito
Films set in a theatre
Films set in Tokyo
Shochiku films
Silent adventure films
Silent horror films